Messiah is a title given to a saviour or liberator of a group of people in Abrahamic religions.

Messiah also may refer to:
Messiah (Handel), a 1741 oratorio by George Frideric Handel
Christ (title), Greek translation of Messiah

Film
 The Messiah (1975 film), an Italian film
 Messiah (1999 film), a French film performance of Handel's oratorio
 The Messiah (2007 film) or Mesih, a 2007 film by Nader Talebzadeh
 Messiah (2011 film), a 2011 film

Television
 Messiah (British TV series), a BBC television drama series
 Messiah (American TV series), a Netflix TV drama
 Messiah (Derren Brown special), a Channel 4 television show

Literature
 The Messiah (novel), a novel by Marjorie Holmes
 Der Messias (Klopstock), an epic poem (ed. 1748 to 1773) by Friedrich Gottlieb Klopstock
 Messiah (English poem), a 1709 poem by Alexander Pope
 Messiah (Latin poem), a poem by Alexander Pope
 Messiah (Starling novel), a 1999 thriller by Boris Starling
 Messiah (Vidal novel), a 1954 satirical novel by Gore Vidal
 The Messiah, a novel by Marek Halter 
 The Messiah, a play by the National Theatre of Brent

Music
 Messiah Stradivarius, a 1716 Stradivari violin

Artists
 Messiah (Swiss band), a death/thrash metal band from Switzerland
 Messiah (UK band), a techno group from London
 Mr. Messiah or Yuri Kostrov, Russian electronic musician and DJ
 Mesiah or Eirik Norheim (born 1967), Norwegian musician, former member of Mayhem

Albums
 Messiah (Fear Factory album)
 Messiah (Mormon Tabernacle Choir album)
 Messiah (EP), a Godflesh EP

Songs
 "Messiah", a 1994 song by The Farm
 "Messiah", a 2013 song by I See Monstas
 "Messiah", a 2015 song by Madonna from Rebel Heart

Religious figures
 Jesus, the Messiah in Christianity
 Moshiach, the Messiah in Judaism
 Messiah ben Joseph, or Mashiach ben Yoseph, also known as Mashiach bar/ben Ephraim, a Jewish messiah from the tribe of Ephraim and a descendant of Joseph

Sports
 The Messiah (wrestler) (born 1977), American professional wrestler
 Lionel Messi or Messiah, Argentinian football player

Other uses
 Messiah (software), a computer animation and rendering package
 Messiah (video game), a 2000 third person shooter video game by Interplay
 Messiah Cathedral, an Indonesian megachurch of the predominantly Indonesian-Chinese Indonesian Reformed Evangelical Church
 Messiah College, a Christian liberal arts college in Grantham, Pennsylvania
 Messiah complex, a state of mind in which an individual holds a belief that they are destined to become a savior

People with the surname
 Aaron Messiah (1858-1940), French architect
 Albert Messiah (1921–2013), French physicist and author of a classic graduate text on quantum mechanics

People with the given name
Messiah Marcolin (born 1967), real name Bror Jan Alfredo Marcolin, also known as Eddie Marcolin, a vocalist in the doom metal band Candlemass

See also
 The Anointed One (disambiguation)
 The Chosen One (disambiguation)
 Christ (disambiguation)
 Church of the Messiah (disambiguation)
 Dark Messiah (disambiguation)
 False messiah
 Kevin Keegan (born 1951), former England football player known as the Geordie messiah
 New Messiah (disambiguation)
 Savage Messiah (disambiguation)